The Séeberger dynasty, known as the Frères Séeberger; three brothers Jules (1872–1932),  Henri (1876-1956) and Louis' (1874-1946) sons Jean (1910-1979) and Albert (1914-1999), pioneered fashion photography in France, beginning in the twentieth century.

Background
Fashion photography began with engravings reproduced from photographs of Leopold-Emile Reutlinger, Nadar and others in the 1890s. After high-quality half-tone reproduction of photographs became possible, most credit as pioneers of the genre goes to the French Baron Adolph de Meyer and the Luxembourgian Edward Steichen who, borrowing his friend’s hand-camera in 1907, candidly photographed dazzlingly-dressed ladies at the Longchamp Racecourse and who by 1911 had been assigned by the French magazine Art et Décoration to produce pictures of dresses by the Parisian designer Paul Poiret, competing with the drawings and pochoir prints earlier, and contemporaneously, used for fashion plates.

The Séebergers

A family devoted to the genre was the Séeberger dynasty over two generations. Three brothers Jules (1872–1932), Louis (1874-1946) and Henri (1876-1956) were born to Jean-Baptiste, a Bavarian tradesman who had migrated to France in 1870, and their mother Louise, a widow from Lyon with a daughter Félicie. The second generation, sons of Louis, brothers Jean (1910-1979) and Albert (1914-1999) also inherited a love of photography. Together, their work spans most of the twentieth century and was devoted to elegance and fashion.

The brothers went to Paris for secondary education at the Lycée Rollin where Louis was awarded first prize for drawing. They completed their schooling at the municipal art school Palissy, before Jules and Louis start their training as designers of fabric at the atelier of J. Souchon, a specialist in “high innovations, gowns, ribbons, damask linens, Jacqaurd fabrics and drafting.”  From thence came an interest, and much inside knowledge of, fashion.

While the three brothers worked as fabric designers, it was in 1891 that Jules started in evening drawing classes and also picked up photography. After a move to 39 rue Lafayette in the 10th Arr., Louis won the Danton Jeune prize dedicated to a disadvantaged child at the Ville de Paris art school, while Jules won a travel grant to Normandy. In the meantime, the youngest, Henri, enrolled at a school for applied art and also won prizes. After the death of their father in 1894 the family moved to the quieter 13 rue Fénelon.

In 1899 Jules submitted photographs to various contests, an interest soon shared by his brothers, winning prizes in amateur competitions organised by the newspaper Lectures Pour Tous. He experimented with bromoil, especially the Rawlins process. Jules took documentary photography awards in 1903 and 1904 for pictures he made on the Seine riverbanks and in Montmartre. Images by the three brothers, who signed their initials (JHLS) were exhibited and published in various journals and as postcards by the Kunzli brothers and Leopold Verger.

Supported by their mother, their older sister and Louis’ wife Anna, the three brothers established a family business in 1909 under the name 'Frères Séeberger' in a studio at 33 rue de Chabrol, also in the 10th and five minutes walk from their home.

Fashion photographers
While magazines like Les Modes published careful portraits, most hand-coloured, of high society women in outfits designed by the renowned couturiers, the daily newspapers like Le Figaro and Le Gaulois had been running pictures in their late editions taken, like Steichen’s, of women at the racetracks, and their approach was taken up by the magazine Femina, in an effort to satisfy the curiosity among their readership about what was fashionable in ‘real clothing’, a trend soon picked up by Paris Illustré or La Nouvelle Mode that from 1901-1902 featured snapshots taken by obscure amateurs Carle de Mazibourg or Edmond Cordonnier, though these were soon displaced by more professional images.

The brothers followed the in-crowd calendar as they went to beach resorts, ski resorts, and other fashionable locations in Paris. Their quarry was photographs of lady’s fashion (and some men’s too). They sent a series of photographs of fashionable women at race tracks to Caroline de Broutelles. She published them in the magazine she founded, La Mode Pratique and the brothers would continue to be published there from May 22, 1909 onwards.

Incidentally, though their focus was on dresses, shoes, bags, hats, furs, and feathers, they also captured imagery of a truly haute couture, a ‘high society’ normally inaccessible to those of their class, who, though conscious at all times of the camera and allowing themselves to be photographed, would only acknowledge those belonging to the great studios and certainly not the Séebergers.

From their imagery, since it was published immediately in a long list of over 50 publications, fashion historians are able to track the influence on style of the great designers Chanel, Paul Poiret, Jeanne Lanvin, Elsa Schiaparelli, Jean Patou, Robert Piguet, Madeleine Vionnet, Lucien Lelong, Paquin et al., of whom the Séebergers also made portraits.

Not all of their subjects were of the higher classes. The great houses of Poiret, Lanvin, Worth or Patou hired models for their slim figures and tutored poses who would troop together ready to be seen and photographed. Lesser, or newer, couturiers hired casuals by the hour and often dressed them in their most eccentric costumes to attract attention, while some wore the insignia of the designers on their backs like sandwich-board bearers while they circulated alone. Milliners did not shy from wearing their own creations. The ‘fashionables’ were another class of model; well-known personalities known as ‘amphibians’, ‘jockeys’ or ‘society consultants’ who, while their celebrity lasted, wore the great designers latest creations sold to them at huge discounts or loaned free.

Style and technique 
The Séeberger’s photography involved knowing these models, keeping up with the latest trends likely to appeal to the publications and an exhausting hunt for the right models amongst the crowds of fashionable racegoers—all the more so when the ‘portable’ cameras, up until around 1935 when Henri adopted the Rolleiflex, were the huge folding Ernemann Klapp Nettel or more cumbersome Thornton Pickard 13 x 18 cm reflex camera, that they used at the Bois de Boulogne and in Saint Moritz. In each case Henri accompanied by his brother Louis directing the model, bearing a notebook to record details of the fashion, and passing dark slides. Even in 1911, despite the awkwardness of their camera, the Séebergers manage, with the assistance of professional models whom they can direct, to convey a sense of immediacy and apparent spontaneity.

The French image 
In addition the brothers’ fashion imagery overlapped with their portrayal of media celebrities including Joséphine Baker and Charlie Chaplin. A lesser known part of their practice, as noted by Gilbert Salachas, from 1923 International Kinema Research employed the Séeberger brothers to document locations which filmmakers adapted to create the formulaic Parisian ‘atmosphere’ in sets for movies such as the 1938 American romantic comedy Bluebeard’s Eighth Wife and A comedy of murders (Charles Chaplin, 1947) or even as late as An American in Paris  (Vincente Minelli, 1951), thus creating a mythic Paris that survives in cinema even today.

The second generation 
 
The death of Julius in 1932 and then the declaration of war mark the final withdrawal of Louis and Henry from the family business, and a brief closure during the war mobilization of the next generation of Séebergers, Jean and Albert, Louis’ two sons who retained the name “Séeberger brothers” until closure in 1977. They were assisted by Jean’s wife Suzanne (as secretary) then successively by Albert’s wife Cecile (in editing), Jean’s son Daniel (as assistant), and various collaborators.

After WW2 the brothers continued with fashion photography as their specialty, alongside some industrial commissions, but with increasing studio work with paid fashion models at a new premises 112 boulevard Malesherbes (in the 17th Arr.). While not in the vanguard, they digested the style of the Le Groupe des XV, typified in the work of Philippe Pottier, Pierre Jahan, René-Jacques, and Lucien Lorelle.

The family loyalty and devotion to photography endured across two busy generations; when Jean died in 1979, Albert wrote:

Major exhibitions 
 1976 : Paris, la rue, Bibliothèque historique de la ville de Paris
 1979-1980 : Les parisiens au fil des jours (1900-1960). Photographies Séeberger frères, Bibliothèque Historique de la Ville de Paris
 1980 : Paris 1950 photographié par le Groupe des XV, Hôtel Lamoignon, Bibliothèque Historique de la Ville de Paris
 1982 : Exposition de photographies des frères Séeberger, MJC, Ribérac
 1992 : Les Séeberger - L'aventure de trois frères photographes au début du siècle, Centre Photographique d’Île-de-France, Pontault-Combault
 1994 : L'Occupation et la Libération de Paris par Jean Séeberger photographe, Centre culturel et bibliothèque municipale de Ribérac-en-Périgord
 1995 : 1910, Paris inondé, Direction du Patrimoine, Paris
 1995 : Le Paris d'Hollywood, sur un air de réalité, Caisse nationale des monuments historiques et des sites, Paris
 1999 : Les frères Séeberger - Une lignée de photographes, Château des Bouillants, Dammarie-les-Lys
 2002 : Séeberger, des photographes dans le siècle, Ancienne synagogue de la Ferté-sous-Jouare 
 2006 : Les Séeberger - Photographes de l'élégance 1909-1939, Bibliothèque nationale de France, Galerie de la Photographie, 58 rue de Richelieu, Paris
 2007 : Collections années 50. Photographies Séeberger frères et Georges Dambier, Collégiale Notre-Dame, Ribérac
 2010 : Le Deauville des Séeberger, Festival Planche(s), Deauville

Collections
 Bibliothèque nationale de France
 Centre des monuments nationaux, Département des ressources documentaires 
 Château-musée de Gien : Chasse, histoire et nature en Val de Loire
 Médiathèque du patrimoine	
 ECPAD
 Bibliothèque nationales de France
 Bibliothèque-musée de l'Opéra
 Bibliothèque historique de la Ville de Paris
 Musée Carnavalet
 Centre Georges Pompidou
 Musée français de la photographie (Bièvres)
 Association Gaston Litaize
 Palais Galliera - Musée de la Mode de la Ville de Paris

Bibliography 
The catalogue of an exhibition of the Séeberger frères held June 27—September 2006 in the Richelieu photography gallery at the la Bibliothèque nationale de France, Sylvie Aubenas‘ and Xavier Demange‘s Elegance : the Seeberger brothers and the birth of fashion photography, is the most authoritative representation of their fashion imagery and the fashions it documents. Other useful books and websites include:

 Bibliothèque Historique de la Ville de Paris, Les parisiens au fil des jours (1900-1960). Séeberger frères, Paris, Bibliothèque Historique de la Ville de Paris, 1980
Les Séeberger. Photographes de l'élégance. 1909-1939, sous la direction de Sylvie Aubenas et Xavier Demange, Paris, Bibliothèque nationale de France, du 27 juin au 3 septembre 2006, Seuil/Bibliothèque nationale de France, 2006
 Catalogue of exhibition Collections années 50. Photographies Séeberger frères et Georges Dambier, Ribérac, Collégiale Notre-Dame, du 5 juillet au 2 septembre 2007
 Séeberger frères (1930s) Ski resort illustrations for Échoes de l’Air, bulletin of Air France, gallica.bnf.fr
 SÉEBERGER Frères. L’élégance des regards, catalogue de vente de la maison Millon, 8 novembre 2016 
 Virginie Chardin, Séeberger frères, Actes Sud, collection Photo Poche, 2006
 Lucien Curzi, « Écrire avec la lumière », Saisons, n°12, automne 1997, pp. 32–36
 
 Eddy Dubois, Images de chasses, Grenoble, Arthaud, 1972
 Jean-Claude Gautrand, Les Séeberger, l'aventure de trois frères photographes au début du siècle, Paris, La Manufacture, Collection « Les poches du patrimoine photographique », 1992
 Thomas Michael Gunther, Isabelle-Cécile Le Mée, Hervé Degand, Catherine Tambrum, Regards sur la Libération de Paris. Photographies, août 1944. Marcel-Arthaud, André Bienvenu, Robert Capa, Henri Cartier-Bresson, Robert Cohen, Robert Doisneau, André Gandner, Pierre Jahan, gaston Paris, Robert Parry, Jean Roubier, Pierre Roughol, Serge de Sazo, Séeberger frères, René Zuber, Paris, Monum éditions du patrimoine, 2004
 Maureen Huault, La seconde génération Séeberger : Jean et Albert (1940-1977), study paper of the Ecole du Louvre presented under the supervision of Mme Dominique de Font-Réaulx, Paris, 2014
 Maureen Huault, Chroniques de la fugacité. Jean et Albert Séeberger deux photographes de mode au cours des 'Trente Glorieuses' (1940-1977), a research paper on the history of art applied to the collections of the École du Louvre, under the supervision of Mme Dominique de Font-Réaulx and Michel Poivert, Paris, 2015
 Maureen Huault, « La valorisation du fonds photographique des frères Séeberger (1906- 1977) au Centre des monuments historiques », Monumental, Revue scientifique et technique des monuments historiques, n°1, premier semestre 2015, pp. 112–113
 Maureen Huault, « Les hommes passent, les images restent : la donation Séeberger au Centre des monuments nationaux », L’œil de la photographie, 24 mai 2017 
 
 
 Meriel McCooey, « Watching the girls go by », Sunday Times Magazine, April 6, 1975
 Elise Pailloncy, Carole Peyrot, Marion Poussier, Yann Revol, Inventaire des photographies des frères Séeberger pendant la période de la Seconde Guerre mondiale, mémoire de l'ENS Louis Lumière, Cours de Mme Denoyelle, septembre 2001
 Gilbert Salachas, Le Paris d'Hollywood. Sur un air de réalité. Besançon, Caisse nationale des Monuments Historiques, 1994
 Albert Séeberger, « Au foyer de la M.J.C., l'exposition de photographies des frères Séeberger », L'écho du ribéracois, juillet 1982
 Dominique Versavel, Maureen Huault, Muriel Berthou-Crestey, « Archives. Mode, les collections de la Bibliothèque nationale de France », Bad to the Bone, n°6, 2015, pp. 64–73

References

French photographers
Fashion photographers
Photography companies of France
Street photographers